Parliamentary elections were held in Iceland on 29 June 1937. Although the Independence Party won a plurality of votes, the Progressive Party emerged as the largest party in the Lower House of the Althing, winning 12 of the 33 seats.

Results

References

Elections in Iceland
Iceland
Parliament
Iceland